Rookes v Barnard [1964] AC 1129 is a UK labour law and English tort law case and the leading case in English law on punitive damages and was a turning point in judicial activism against trade unions.

The case was almost immediately reversed by the Trade Disputes Act 1965 insofar as it decided on economic torts, although the law on punitive damages remains authoritative.

Facts
Douglas Rookes was a draughtsman, employed by British Overseas Airways Corporation (BOAC). He resigned from his union, the Association of Engineering and Shipbuilding Draughtsman (AESD), after a disagreement. BOAC and AESD had a closed shop agreement, and AESD threatened a strike unless Rookes resigned also from his job or was fired. BOAC suspended Rookes and, after some months, dismissed him with one week's salary in lieu of proper notice.

Rookes sued the union officials, including Mr Barnard, the branch chairman (also the divisional organiser Mr Silverthorne and the shop steward Mr Fistal). Rookes said that he was the victim of a tortious intimidation that had used unlawful means to induce BOAC to terminate his contract. The strike was alleged to be the unlawful means.

Judgment
At first instance, before Sachs J, the action succeeded. This was overturned in the Court of Appeal. The House of Lords reversed the court of appeal, finding in favour of Rookes and against the union. Citing a case from the 18th century entitled Tarelton v M'Gawley (1793) Peake 270 where a ship fired a cannonball across the bow of another, Lord Reid said the union was guilty of the tort of intimidation. It was unlawful intimidation "to use a threat to break their contracts with their employer as a weapon to make him do something which he was legally entitled to do but which they knew would cause loss to the plaintiff".

A corollary to the main issue in the case, but of greater lasting importance, was Lord Devlin's pronouncements on when punitive damages are applied. The only three situations in which damages are allowed to be punitive, i.e. with the purpose of punishing the wrongdoer rather than aiming simply to compensate the claimant, are in cases of,

Oppressive, arbitrary or unconstitutional actions by the servants of government.
Where the defendant's conduct was "calculated" to make a profit for himself.
Where a statute expressly authorises the same.

This aspect of Rookes v Barnard has not been followed in Canada, New Zealand or Australia.

In Broome v Cassell, Lord Denning in the Court of Appeal called Lord Devlin's approach "unworkable" and suggested it was decided per incuriam. He was strongly criticised in the House of Lords, which upheld Rookes v Barnard.

Significance
The case was met with immediate outrage for creating, or reviving, economic torts as a weapon to undermine the right to strike. It was reversed by the Trade Disputes Act 1965.

See also
Labour law
Tort law

Notes

References
LH Hoffmann, 'Rookes v Barnard' (1965) 81 LQR 116, regarding punitive damages
*
E. McGaughey, A Casebook on Labour Law (Hart 2019) ch 12, 567

English tort case law
United Kingdom labour case law
1964 in England
House of Lords cases
1964 in case law
1964 in British law
United Kingdom trade union case law